The Debin is a river in the Yagodninsky district of Magadan Oblast, Russia. It is a left hand tributary of the Kolyma.

Yagodnoye village is located on the left bank of the Debin; the R504 Kolyma Highway crosses the river in its middle course and runs on the northern side of the river, roughly parallel to its lower course until it bends northwards near Debin.

The name of the river is based on the Yakut word "daebin" (дьэбин), meaning "rust".

History
Since the 1960s placer gold deposits have been exploited in the Debin river basin. As a result, there has been much environmental degradation in certain places. Some of the settlements involved in mining operations in the river basin have been abandoned. Only the villages of Burkhala, located near the R504 Highway bridge, and Senokosny, near Yagodnoye have survived, albeit with only a residual population.

Course 
The Debin has its sources in the eastern slopes of Mount Spornaya, east of the highest point of the Cherge Range at the eastern end of the Chersky Range, where it overlaps with the Upper Kolyma Highlands. There is continuous permafrost in the area. The river heads first in a roughly southeastern direction through a narrow valley. It bends to the east in its lower course, meandering in a floodplain with lakes. There is an airfield south of the mouth area, with a road connecting it to Debin. Just below the confluence of the Debin,  from its mouth, the valley of the Kolyma expands into a floodplain where its channel divides into branches.

The Debin is located in a sparsely-populated region of severe cold winters; it usually freezes in early October and stays frozen until May.

See also
List of rivers of Russia

References

External links
Ust-Srednekan hydroelectric power plant

Rivers of Magadan Oblast